Heinz Binder (born 29 January 1943) is an Austrian retired footballer.

References

External links
 Austria Archiv
 Sturm Archiv

1943 births
Living people
Austrian footballers
Austria international footballers
Association football defenders
Austrian Football Bundesliga players
Austrian football managers
FK Austria Wien players
FC Wacker Innsbruck players
Grazer AK players
Grazer AK managers
DSV Leoben managers
FC Wacker Innsbruck managers
FC Tirol Innsbruck managers